Summerhill Township is the name of some places in the U.S. state of Pennsylvania:

Summerhill Township, Cambria County, Pennsylvania
Summerhill Township, Crawford County, Pennsylvania

Pennsylvania township disambiguation pages